The Charlemagne chessmen are a group of 11th century chess pieces made from ivory, now in the Cabinet des Médailles, Bibliothèque Nationale in Paris, France.  In 1598 the set contained 30 pieces, but after the French Revolution only 16 pieces survived. Next to the Lewis chessmen, the set is thought to be the second-most important collection of medieval chess pieces in the world. It is one of the best-preserved sets of figures from the High Middle Ages.

Legend 

The legend regarding the set states that these chessmen were given as a gift to Charlemagne by Caliph Harun al-Rashid, who was an avid chess player.  But they were made at least two centuries later than this.

A chess set was first noted in a book of anecdotes concerning the life of Charlemagne from the 880s by Notker the Stammerer, who describes a mission sent by Harun to Charlemange in 802AD, giving a list of gifts sent by the Caliph, which included an elephant and a set of chessmen. If this story were true, it would be evidence that chess was played in Europe centuries earlier than previously thought. While the Royal Frankish Annals provide an arrival of an elephant named Abul-Abbas, there is no mention of the chess pieces. Therefore, it is unlikely that Charlemagne had knowledge of the game of chess. 

According to another story, the game was a gift from the Byzantine Empress Irene of Athens (d. 803), which also does not match their date.

History 

The set is estimated to have been made between 1050–1100 in Salerno, Italy. According to one historian, "The fact that these pieces are figurative representations of people and animals rather than abstract Islamic designs also suggest that they were made in Europe rather than imported from somewhere with the Caliphate."

Various theories concern its original owners. Possibly it was created for Robert Guiscard (died 1085), a Norman leader, or even for Pope Gregory VII. Later it was a gift to a French king, either Philip II or Philip III.

From the 13th to 18th centuries, the set was in the Treasury of Saint-Denis at Saint Denis Abbey near Paris. In 1598, the set was inventoried and stated to be a set of 30 pieces. In 1625, the set was first associated with Charlemagne in a report on the history of the abbey. 

During the French Revolution, when property was confiscated from the clergy, only 16 of the 30 pieces survived and were stored at the Cabinet des Médailles, Bibliothèque Nationale in 1794.

Description 

The chess pieces are all carved from blocks of ivory, which measure up to 15cm in height, while the kings weigh almost up to 1kg. There are also traces of red paint on some of the figures. 

The pieces include four elephants. Since chess bishops are called elephants in both Russian (slon) and Arabic (al-fīl, giving Spanish alfil and Italian alfiere), it can be assumed that these elephants are what we would nowadays call bishops.

The human figures are clothed and armed in the Norman style, as depicted in the Bayeux Tapestry. The figures thus belong to the Norman–Sicilian style, which mixes of European, Arabic-Islamic and Byzantine artistic styles.

The "housing", which is elaborated with architectural details and emphasizes the king and queen, is peculiar. The carvings each show a semicircular pavilion with arcades on the back and a straight front in the shape of a ciborium. In the scene, servants pull up a curtain from both sides, which previously shielded the appearance of the king or queen and the room behind. It is the revelation of the monarch, the climax of the Byzantine court ceremony.

Only sixteen pieces of the original set survive. Missing from the set are 15 pawns and a rook, as a complete chess set has thirty-two pieces, including sixteen pawns. The surviving pieces are:
two kings
two queens
three quadrigas (rook)
four knights
four elephants (bishop);
one foot soldier (pawn).

A large elephant piece—the Elephant of Charlemagne—was once treated as a part of the set, but is now recognized as a separate piece, possibly not even a gamepiece.

Gallery

See also

History of chess

References

Further reading 

Harold J. R. Murray: A History of Chess.
Hans Wichmann, Siegfried Wichmann : Schach. Origin and transformation of the character in twelve centuries.

Chess in Italy
Chess in France
Chess sets
History of chess
Ivory works of art
Medieval chess